A Date to Skate is an American animated short film, released on November 18, 1938 and starring Popeye the Sailor.

Summary
Popeye & Olive Oyl stroll happily along arm-in-arm and stop short when Popeye catches sight of a roller rink: Good Skates 50 cents, Cheap Skates 25 cents the declares. Asked to go skating, Olive protests that she does not know how; but Popeye will teach her! Within, the attendant asks Popeye what size of skates he wishes to rent, and Popeye, observing Olive's long feet, blushes, either not wishing to say or not knowing. "Make a fist," he suggests to his best girl, and the attendant shall measure it. ("A hand like a foot and a half," he mutters, deftly wrapping a skate about the lady's great clenched hand.) The long, long, slender skates procured, Popeye hammers them with his brawny fists to the bottom of Olive's shoes; she falls over a couple of times as Popeye delicately slips on his own. We roll over to the rink proper, and Popeye, swinging his arms as if he's rowing a canoe, a bit too gracefully demonstrates the proper technique; Olive attempts to move, but can only kick the air in desperation and flap her skinny arms as she falls headfirst into the railing around the rink. She frees her head by her own strength, but her feet, fanning out, become stuck in the same way as a result: with a struggle, one foot is freed, and an exasperated Olive is helped at last by Popeye, who gently releases the other foot and dusts off his indignant companion (adept enough to tap her foot impatiently), and he points out all of the other rinkgoers merrily whizzing about.

They step out together, Olive's hands inconveniently obscuring Popeye's eyes; as they inch forward, Popeye is caught on another, faster skater and falls over, leaving Olive to fend for herself. She manages to stop and, then, to her misfortune, to go—and down she goes on her behind, her hat doing a flip in the air. Popeye glides over, stands her up, and offers another demonstration, his muscled arms again so like a sailor's, his hands sometimes victoriously at his hips, here clasped behind his back, now joined latticewise above his head. He motions for Olive to take the floor again; more confident somehow, she agrees, and seems at last to have a sense of the movement needed. But she stumbles, knocking over another skater, falling on her front, blowing her hat's drooping daisy out of her face. Popeye skates athwart her and slides her up in front of him, pushing her by the back as they roll along; he stomps and bids her do the same, and they seem to be having a pleasant time of their outing until Popeye lets go again. As Olive stumbles and flails about, Popeye, clutching a pillow, chases her. Olive grasps a pillar for momentary relief, but her legs splay about as fumblingly she tries to exit the rink; Popeye crashes into her support and the force shoots Olive out the door and of the rink. She catches a street lamp and, swinging about the pole, flings herself down the sidewalk; Popeye emerges, pillow still in hand; Olive flies along and is stopped by a trolley emerging from an opening cellar door. Suspended for the nonce on the arms of the trolley, Olive unwittingly makes a path for Popeye between her spread and spindly legs.

On, on he speeds; falls the trolley and Olive rolls on, out into the busy street, falling on her face in the midst of traffic. Popeye notices mid-roll that Olive is well behind him; the strong seaman forces a turn just as he is about to fly off a short, wooden dock. Olive feebly tries to stand as a car taps her rear end and sends her soaring into the revolving door of "Lacy and Co." department store, which sends a great lady-patron flying out the door and her packages out of her hands and into the air. Our heroine much-beset rolls on into a crowded elevator just as it closes; up it goes, and out she rolls. Gangway! as she slips still a-rolling under a long table bedecked with tableware and down a long ramp. Popeye stands in thought without the store as the same patron we have seen already collects her things; just as this hapless bystander is about to cap her tower of boxes, out rolls Olive, knocking over the lady-schlimazel again. Our heroine is in traffic again, and her support this time must be a crossing guard's rotating sign: STOP! GO! STOP! GO!--and the drivers too willingly oblige every fired-off instruction! Olive is ejected into a left turn and begins to collect herself as she is caught by a passing firetruck. Popeye catches sight of Olive, her wheeled legs butterflying as the truck thunders along. Popeye searches all over his clothes for his can of spinach: "I must be getting old," he mutters. "Now don't tell me I left it at home!" Have you any spinach for Popeye? A helpful shadow in the dark house pitches a handy can of the miracle-vegetable to the Sailor-Man, who gulps it down without a moment to spare. Arms (and wheels!) at once feel the power and our hero charges forward, over a car (whose stunned driver crashes into another's car), under a truck, over another, hopping from car to car here, ducking now under this automobile and that. Panicked Olive Oyl unwillingly braves death: the truck makes a left turn and she is flung down a great hill; her arms flail as she skirts passing vehicles. Popeye follows, still in control. There is a hump and a fork in the road of which Olive & Popeye take opposite paths, reuniting in a crash at the end: Olive is flung into the air and lands in her beau's mighty hands. Is she hurt? Hardly! She wants to go again, singing, "My heart's palpitatin'/whenever I'm skatin'/with Popeye the Sailor-Man!"

Production notes
A Date to Skate is the last cartoon made by Dave and Max Fleischer at their studio in New York City, New York and the last Fleischer cartoon to feature Mae Questel as the voice of Olive Oyl. Hereafter and until the demise of the Fleischers' studio, Popeye's shorts would be animated in Miami, Florida, and Margie Hines would be the voice of Olive until Mae Questel's return in 1944. The cartoon is in the public domain in the United States.

References

External links
 A Date to Skate on YouTube

Popeye the Sailor theatrical cartoons
1938 short films
1938 animated films
Paramount Pictures short films
American black-and-white films
Fleischer Studios short films
Short films directed by Dave Fleischer
1930s English-language films
American comedy short films
American animated short films
Roller skating films
1930s American films